The Ghosts of Buxley Hall is a 1980 American made-for-television fantasy-comedy film produced by Walt Disney Productions, directed by Bruce Bilson and starring Dick O'Neill, Victor French, Louise Latham and Monte Markham. It was originally broadcast as a two-part episode of Disney's Wonderful World on December 21 and December 28, 1980.

The Ghosts of Buxley Hall was filmed on location at Banning House in the Wilmington section of Los Angeles, California.

Synopsis
When the 100-year-old Buxley Military Academy falls on hard financial times and is forced to merge with a school for girls, the academy's resident ghosts – General Eulace C. Buxley, Bettina Buxley and Sergeant Major Chester B. Sweet – are aggrieved and aroused from their sleep to seek justice. Outraged by this disrespect of tradition, the spirits are further appalled by a modern world of equal rights for women and rock 'n' roll, as well as the dishonest designs a wealthy matron has for the school. The ghost trio declares war on the living who are involved in their own battle of the sexes.

Cast
Dick O'Neill as General Eulace C. Buxley 
Victor French as Sergeant Major Chester B. Sweet 
Louise Latham as Bettina Buxley 
Rad Daly as Jeremy Ross 
Monte Markham as Colonel Joe Buxley
Ruta Lee as Ernestine Di Gonzini 
Vito Scotti as Count Sergio Luchesi Di Gonzini
Don Porter as Judge Oliver Haynes 
Steve Franken as Virgil Quinby 
Renne Jarrett as Emily Wakefield 
Christian Juttner as Cadet Captain Hubert Fletcher 
Tricia Cast as Posie Taylor
Guy Raymond as Ben Grissom 
John Myhers as E.L. Hart 
Joe Tornatore as Vincent
Stu Gilliam as Lt. Jim Rodney 
John Ericson as George Ross
Tony Becker as Todd
Karyn Harrison as Waitress 
Billy Jacoby as David Williams

Production
On April 5, 1981, a little over four months after the December broadcast of The Ghosts of Buxley Hall, director Bruce Bilson married one of the film's co-stars, Renne Jarrett.

Release
The Ghosts of Buxley Hall was released on VHS by Walt Disney Home Video in the 1980s. On September 18, 2012, it was released on DVD as a Disney Movie Club Exclusive, available only to club members for mail or online ordering.

Broadcast
Turner Classic Movies presented The Ghosts of Buxley Hall on October 28, 2015 as part of its "Treasures From the Disney Vault" combined with a "Salute to Halloween". Shown before "The Ghosts of Buxley Hall" were The Three Little Pigs (1933), The Big Bad Wolf (1934), Three Little Wolves (1936), The Adventures of Ichabod and Mr. Toad (1949), The Old Mill (1937), "The Plausible Impossible" (1956), Escape to Witch Mountain (1975), Lonesome Ghosts (1937), Frankenweenie (1984) and Mr. Boogedy (1986). Following "The Ghosts of Buxley Hall", the Disney-Halloween salute concluded with Return from Witch Mountain (1978).

References

External links

1980 television films
1980 films
1980s fantasy comedy films
American fantasy comedy films
NBC network original films
Films directed by Bruce Bilson
Films scored by Frank De Vol
Ghosts in television
Fictional ghosts
Walt Disney anthology television series episodes
Disney television films
1980s American films